Ali Acun Ilıcalı (born 29 May 1969) is a Turkish broadcaster, entrepreneur, international TV producer, and businessman. He is the founder and director of ACUNMEDYA, an international television production company. He is also the owner of Exatlon, which is the first sports reality television show in the world.

Several documentaries and programs have been made about Ilıcalı's life, covering his career from sports reporter to media mogul.

He has been awarded more than 1000 prizes in various categories and has been described as one of the most reliable names in Turkey. From 2018 to 2021, he was listed among the 500 most influential businessmen in the media and entertainment sector by Variety magazine.

Early years 

Acun Ilıcalı, whose family comes from Turkey's northeast Erzurum Province, was born in Edirne on 29 May 1969. He has paternal Azerbaijani ancestry. After completing his primary education in Edirne, he completed his middle and high school education in Istanbul. He graduated from Kadıköy Anatolian High School. Ilıcalı began his higher education in English teaching at Istanbul University, but left to go into business.

Media Career 

Ilıcalı entered the media sector at the age of 22 (year 1991 or 1992) and began working for Turkish television channel Show TV as a sports reporter. In 2002, Ilıcalı produced several programs and content for a number of Turkey's most popular television channels.

His travel/entertainment program, Acun Firarda, which he prepared and presented himself by travelling to more than 100 countries, was particularly successful. He quickly became one of the most recognized names in Turkey, where his shows typically enjoyed very high ratings. Jennifer Şebnem Schaefer took part in the fashion-related parts of the program.

In 2004, Ilıcalı founded his own production company ACUNMEDYA. The company purchased the broadcasting rights to famous shows and adapted them for Turkish viewers. The shows included Deal or No Deal?, Fear Factor, Survivor, MasterChef, Got Talent, The Voice, Dancing with the Stars, Rising Star and Ninja Warrior, all of which were broadcast on popular prime-time slots.

In 2013, ACUNMEDYA acquired the television channel TV8. With ACUNMEDYA productions, TV8's ratings increased rapidly, soon becoming Turkey's most widely viewed TV channel. ACUNMEDYA subsequently forged a partnership with Doğuş Production Group, one of Turkey's most prominent media companies.

In 2016, Ilıcalı launched the entertainment and sports channel TV8.5, which quickly became one of the country's most highly viewed thematic TV channels.

In 2016, Ilıcalı produced projects in Greece, marking his first foray into the international media sector. ACUNMEDYA produced a number of television programs in Greece, including The Voice, Survivor, Got Talent and My Style Rocks for broadcast on Skai TV. The programs had ratings of 70% and were some of the most-viewed programs in Greek television history.

As a result of its successes in Greece, ACUNMEDYA developed a format bringing sports and reality programming together for the first time. Exatlon, a new reality sports competition program, began broadcasting in 2017 to an international audience. was broadcasting in a number of countries, including USA, Mexico, Romania, Slovenia, Colombia, Brazil and Hungary. At the 2017 Brazil edition, presented by the local host Luís Ernesto Lacombe, Ilıcalı and some partners menaced the local presenter hours before the grand final and took the stage himself. Exatlon currently remains among the most highly viewed programs in the countries in which it is broadcast. Following the success of Exatlon, Ilıcalı concluded an agreement with Ricardo Salinas, owner of Mexico's largest media group, for the production of television content for a three-year period. These productions are currently being broadcast in both daytime and evening slots on Azteca Uno, Mexico's most popular television channel.

Today, through the formats he has developed and the global program rights he has purchased, ACUNMEDYA produces content on four continents and in more than 10 countries.

ACUNMEDYA also launched Exxen a digital broadcasting platform that focused on family-oriented content. Exxen has more than 1 million subscribers. Exxen has acquired broadcasting rights for UEFA Champions League, UEFA Europa League and UEFA Europa Conference League. These organizations have been broadcast in Turkey for three seasons on Exxen.

Since 2008, Ilıcalı has been one of Turkey's top 100 largest taxpayers.

Sports Teams 
In 2020, Ilıcalı purchased a partnership in Dutch football team Fortuna Sittard in the Eredivisie League. In 2021, he ended his partnership with the team.

In 2022, Ilıcalı's company ACUNMEDYA purchased the English football team Hull City A.F.C. from Assem Allam.

Personal life 

Ilıcalı has been married three times, and has four daughters. In 1989, he married Seda Başbuğ with whom he has a daughter. 

Ilıcalı's hobbies include riding and collecting speedboats, sports cars and motorcycles. He is also interested in e-sports, a global trend that has become increasingly popular in recent years. A lover of both football and basketball, Ilıcalı follows both sports very closely and frequently attends matches all over the world. He is also a huge fan of Turkey's Fenerbahçe football team and is the owner of English football club Hull City.

References

External links

 

1969 births
Living people
Golden Butterfly Award winners
Kadıköy Anadolu Lisesi alumni
People from Aşkale
Turkish businesspeople
Turkish game show hosts
Turkish male film actors
Turkish male television actors
Turkish sports journalists